Knema pubiflora is a species of plant in the family Myristicaceae. It is endemic to Borneo. It is a Mid-canopy tree up to 38 m tall and 41 cm dbh. Stem with red sap. Stipules absent. Leaves alternate, rather small, simple, penni-veined, glabrous to hairy below, whitish below. Flowers ca. 4 mm diameter, yellow-brown, placed in bundles. Fruits ca. 21 mm long, yellow-orange-brown, hairy, dehiscent capsules. Seeds with nearly undivided red aril.

References

pubiflora
Endemic flora of Borneo
Trees of Borneo
Near threatened flora of Asia
Taxonomy articles created by Polbot